Wei-Chuan USA was founded by the original parent company Wei-Chuan Food Corporation of Taiwan in 1972. Wei-Chuan USA's corporate logo includes five red circles which represent the five basic flavors: sweet, sour, salty, bitter, and umami. Wei-Chuan USA is known for its frozen oriental food and ingredient and its product can be found in numerous grocery stores and restaurants..In 1998, the Wei-Chuan USA spin off from its parent company creating Wei-Chuan Asia and Wei-Chuan USA, now operating separately from one another. The parent company Wei-Chuan was spin-off and sold to Ting Hsin International Group. As part of the agreement, Wei-Chuan also divest from Wei-Chuan USA and sold its share to the founding family of Hotai. As such, Wei-Chuan USA now operating separately from Wei-Chuan Food Corporation.
The company is now associated with Hotai Motor

Wei-Chuan USA now employs more than 500 workers, operates two manufacturing facilities in Los Angeles and Tennessee, and six distribution centers located in Jersey City, San Francisco, Chicago, Atlanta, City of Industry, and Houston. It is currently one of the largest Asian food manufacturer base in the United States.

References

External links

Brand name condiments
Food and drink companies established in 1972
Chinese cuisine
Taiwanese brands
Manufacturing companies based in Taipei
Food and drink companies of Taiwan